Ron Acks (born October 3, 1944) is a former professional American football player who played linebacker for nine seasons for the Atlanta Falcons, New England Patriots, and Green Bay Packers.

Acks attended high school at Carbondale Community High School, where his football coach was Frank Bleyer; Acks was "inducted into the Carbondale Sports Hall of Fame" in 2012.  In college, he played at the running back position on the 1963 and 1964 Fighting Illini teams at the University of Illinois.

References

1944 births
Living people
Atlanta Falcons players
New England Patriots players
Green Bay Packers players
Illinois Fighting Illini football players
People from Herrin, Illinois
Players of American football from Illinois